Air Mediterranean is a Greek charter airline headquartered in Athens and based at Athens International Airport.

History
In January 2017 Air Mediterranean obtained its air operator's certificate (AOC), under the Hellenic Civil Aviation Authority in accordance with the European Aviation Safety Agency (EASA) Regulation.

The airline's plan was to cover the gaps between countries with poor or no connectivity, linking Europe with the rapidly expanding markets of the Middle East and Africa, using Athens as a hub. Air Mediterranean commenced scheduled passenger operations on 1 November 2017. However, on 18 January 2018, the airline suspended all flights until further notice. In February 2018, the airline announced it would cease all scheduled operations and focus on charter operations instead.

Destinations
As of June 2020, Air Mediterranean focuses on charter/ACMI operations.

Fleet

As of February 2023, the Air Mediterranean fleet consists of the following aircraft:

References

External links
 

Airlines of Greece
Airlines established in 2017
Greek companies established in 2017
Companies based in Athens